Joey Chernyim or Joey Ghana (born: December 28, 1974), is a Ghanaian comedian based in Thailand. He known as a supporting actor, and former footballer  who played as a goalkeeper.

Biography & career
He was born as Musa Amidou Johnson in Accra, Ghana. Johnson was a Ghana national under-17 football team player, and played  for the Selangor FA of Malaysia Super League, Malaysia.  Then he moved to Singapore, but with the high cost of living, he traveled to Thailand following his friend's persuasion in 1999.

In Thailand, the selection of players with the TTM Thailand Tobacco Monopoly F.C., while waiting to be screened. His friend have invited to open a clothing store, but suffered a loss. Later he found and known to Thep Po-ngam, a famous comedian, who is planning to find a comedian who is a foreigner already. His first film was Duk dum dui  in 2003.

His well-known joke is the scene that answers the question of Theng Therdtherng in the Phao Taek in 2010, when Theng asked, "Mosquitoes in Ghana that flies or walks ?", which he thought was a very bugging question.

In addition, Johnson also starred with the world-famous Hong Kong-born Chinese martial artist Jackie Chan in The Medallion in 2003.

Filmography
Sodemacom Killer (sequel of Killer Tattoo; 2020)
Cry No Fear (2018)
I Fine..Thank You..Love You (cameo; 2014) 
 Sweet & Sour Revenge (2012) 
Love Summer (2011; with Pimchanok Luevisadpaibul, Thanwa Suriyajak)
Vampire Strawberry (2011) 
Bangkok Revenge (2011) 
Luer Lae (2011)
Phao Taek (2010)
Luang phii theng III (The Holy Man III; 2010) 
The Vanquisher (2009; with Sarunyu Wongkrachang)
Teng Nong Khon Maha-Hia (2007) 
Lahu Funnyman (short; 2006) 
Duk dum dui (2003)
The Medallion (2003)

References

External links
 

Living people
1974 births
Ghanaian footballers
Ghanaian expatriate sportspeople in Thailand
Expatriate footballers in Malaysia
Ghanaian expatriate footballers
Ghana international footballers
Footballers from Accra
21st-century Ghanaian male actors
Ghanaian comedians
Association football goalkeepers
Selangor FA players
Ghanaian male film actors
Ghanaian Muslims